A sliver building is a tall slender building constructed on a lot with a narrow frontage, typically  or less. Since the mid-1980s, one of the most remarkable advances in tall building design has been their construction to unprecedented slenderness ratios.

The now defunct New York City Board of Estimate banned these type of structures from many residential zoning districts in New York City in 1983, after residents objected to their construction. The resurgence of the real estate market there prior to the economic downturn of 2008 led to a resurgence of these buildings, now constructed in commercial districts.

See also
 Sliver (film)

Notes

External links
 "Plots & Plans" article on The Austrian Cultural Forum on 52nd Street, New York, NY, USA.
 Curbed blog article on proposed sliver building at 785 8th Av., New York, NY, USA. 
 "Tall and Thin, Back in Fashion"—New York Times article on sliver buildings from March 18, 2007

Towers